Mac in a Sac is a waterproof jacket, manufactured by Target Dry in Belfast, Northern Ireland The jacket has been produced since 1987 and sold across Europe. As well as jackets, the company makes overtrousers, ponchos and full length coats.

The company also moved into e-commerce in 2010, starting up their own website

Reviewing the Mac in a Sac, The Spokesman said it was a good purchase for a casual "just in case" user, but suggested it was not suitable for serious hikers.

References

External links
 Mac in a Sac Website

Outdoor clothing brands